The Cheja Range is an icefield-bound mountain range on the inside perimeter of the Alaska Panhandle in northernwestern British Columbia, Canada. It lies between the South Whiting River and the Samotua River. It is a subrange of the Boundary Ranges which in turn form part of the Pacific Cordillera mountain system.  The name is an approximation of a phrase in the Tahltan language meaning "mountains are hard".

See also
List of mountain ranges

References

Boundary Ranges
Cassiar Country
Mountain ranges of British Columbia